The 1929 Georgia Tech Yellow Jackets football team represented the Georgia Tech Yellow Jackets of the Georgia Institute of Technology during the 1929 college football season. The Tornado was coached by William Alexander in his tenth year as head coach and compiled a record of 3–6.

Schedule

References

Georgia Tech
Georgia Tech Yellow Jackets football seasons
Georgia Tech Yellow Jackets football